Frank Hunter and Vincent Richards were the defending champions, but did not participate.

Jean Borotra and René Lacoste defeated Raymond Casey and John Hennessey in the final, 6–4, 11–9, 4–6, 1–6, 6–3 to win the gentlemen's doubles tennis title at the 1925 Wimbledon Championships.

Draw

Finals

Top half

Section 1

Section 2

The nationality of A Holm-Smith is unknown.

Bottom half

Section 3

Section 4

The nationality of R Chose is unknown.

References

External links

Men's Doubles
Wimbledon Championship by year – Men's doubles